Daniel McStay (born 24 June 1995) is an Australian rules footballer who plays for the Collingwood Football Club in the Australian Football League (AFL). McStay was recruited from the Eastern Ranges in the TAC Cup with pick 25 in the 2013 AFL Draft. McStay made his AFL debut against the North Melbourne Football Club in Round 15, 2014, playing at centre half-back.

In the dying moments of his first game, with the Lions leading by 4 points, McStay over-stepped the goal square when taking a kick-in from full-back resulting in a ball up in the Lions' defensive goal square. The Kangaroos failed to score from the stoppage and the Lions held on to win by 4 points in Jonathan Brown's farewell game.

After the completion of the 2022 AFL season, McStay wished to explore free agency and departed the Brisbane Lions after 9 years. Early in the trade period, he signed a five-year contract with Collingwood.

Statistics
Updated to the end of the 2022 season 

|-
| 2014 ||  || 25
| 9 || 7 || 0 || 50 || 57 || 107 || 42 || 10 || 0.8 || 0.0 || 5.6 || 6.3 || 11.9 || 4.7 || 1.1 || 0
|-
| 2015 ||  || 25
| 20 || 19 || 10 || 91 || 72 || 163 || 72 || 26 || 1.0 || 0.5 || 4.6 || 3.6 || 8.2 || 3.6 || 1.3 || 0
|-
| 2016 ||  || 25
| 12 || 4 || 0 || 66 || 72 || 138 || 46 || 24 || 0.3 || 0.0 || 5.5 || 6.0 || 11.5 || 3.8 || 2.0 || 0
|-
| 2017 ||  || 25
| 19 || 1 || 1 || 119 || 103 || 222 || 95 || 33 || 0.1 || 0.1 || 6.3 || 5.4 || 11.7 || 5.0 || 1.7 || 0
|-
| 2018 ||  || 25
| 19 || 22 || 18 || 106 || 66 || 172 || 81 || 42 || 1.2 || 0.9 || 5.6 || 3.5 || 9.1 || 4.3 || 2.2 || 0
|-
| 2019 ||  || 25
| 24 || 21 || 16 || 120 || 122 || 242 || 100 || 50 || 0.9 || 0.7 || 5.0 || 5.1 || 10.1 || 4.2 || 2.1 || 0
|-
| 2020 ||  || 25
| 17 || 11 || 6 || 80 || 45 || 125 || 54 || 27 || 0.6 || 0.4 || 4.7 || 2.6 || 7.4 || 3.2 || 1.6 || 0
|-
| 2021 ||  || 25
| 19 || 28 || 10 || 120 || 71 || 191 || 88 || 58 || 1.5 || 0.5 || 6.3 || 3.7 || 10.1 || 4.6 || 3.1 || 2
|-
| 2022 ||  || 25
| 22 || 25 || 12 || 162 || 102 || 264 || 116 || 40 || 1.1 || 0.5 || 7.4 || 4.6 || 12.0 || 5.3 || 1.8 || 2
|- class=sortbottom
! colspan=3 | Career
! 161 !! 138 !! 73 !! 914 !! 709 !! 1623 !! 694 !! 310 !! 0.9 !! 0.5 !! 5.7 !! 4.4 !! 10.1 !! 4.3 !! 1.9 !! 4
|}

Notes

References

External links

1995 births
Living people
Brisbane Lions players
Eastern Ranges players
Australian rules footballers from Victoria (Australia)
Collingwood Football Club players